Arena Wars is an action and real-time strategy game released by Tri Synergy and Ascaron Entertainment in 2004.

Gameplay
The game is notable for combining strategy and shooter elements in gameplay. The limited unit choices (6) and specials (one for each unit) make the game extremely balanced. There are no resources needed to build units, as every player has exactly 1000 credits. Building units uses credits, but a player that loses a unit regains the money instantly and can rebuild it (or another unit), penalized only by the time taken to rebuild. Players also do not construct buildings, but use buildings located at fixed positions on the map. Players win the game by completing one of three objectives, depending on the game type:
 Capture the Flag - stealing the flag from an opposing base
 Bombing Run - carrying a bomb into an opposing base
 Double Domination - controlling "domination zones" for a period of time

As opposing players have equal options, high-level strategy, fast decision making, and precise micromanagement are key factors for success.

Development
Arena Wars was the first commercial game to utilize the .NET Framework; however, it used a managed OpenGL wrapper rather than the XNA Framework/Direct3D API.

Reception

The game received "generally favorable reviews" according to the review aggregation website Metacritic.

References

External links
 

2004 video games
Ascaron games
Real-time strategy video games
Video games developed in Germany
Windows games
Windows-only games
Tri Synergy games